Leonard Salomon Ornstein (12 November 1880 in Nijmegen, the Netherlands – 20 May 1941 in Utrecht, the Netherlands) was a Dutch physicist.

Biography 
Ornstein studied theoretical physics with Hendrik Antoon Lorentz at University of Leiden. He subsequently carried out Ph.D. research under the supervision of Lorentz, concerning an application of the statistical mechanics of Gibbs to molecular problems.

In 1914, Ornstein was appointed professor of physics, as successor of Peter Debye, at University of Utrecht. Among his doctoral students was Jan Frederik Schouten. In 1922, he became director of Physical Laboratory (Fysisch Laboratorium) and extended his research interests to experimental subjects. His precision measurements concerning intensities of spectral lines brought Physical Laboratory in the international limelight.

Ornstein is also remembered for the Ornstein-Zernike theory (named after himself and Frederik Zernike) concerning correlation functions,
and the Ornstein-Uhlenbeck process (named after Ornstein and George Uhlenbeck), a stochastic process.

Together with Gilles Holst, director of Philips Research Laboratories (Philips Natuurkundig Laboratorium), he was the driving force behind establishing the Dutch Physical Society (Netherlands Physical Society, Nederlandse Natuurkundige Vereniging, NNV) in 1921. From 1939 until November 1940 he was Chairman of this Society. From 1918 until 1922 Ornstein was Chairman of the Dutch Zionist Society (Nederlandse Zionistische Vereniging). In 1929, he became member of the Royal Netherlands Academy of Arts and Sciences.

Immediately after the involvement of the Netherlands in the World War II (see Battle of the Netherlands), a friend from the United States of America, the astronomer Peter van de Kamp, offered to bring Ornstein and his family to America. However, Ornstein did not accept this offer, since, as he put it, he would not leave his laboratory in Utrecht. Owing to his Jewish heritage, Ornstein was summarily dismissed from the University in September 1940. He was even barred from entering his own laboratory. In November 1940, he was officially dismissed from the University. On 29 November 1940 Ornstein willingly withdrew his membership of the Dutch Physical Society. During this period he increasingly distanced himself from public life, to the degree that he no longer wished to receive guests at home. Ornstein died on 20 May 1941, six months after being barred from University.

One of the five buildings of Department of Physics of University of Utrecht, the Ornstein Laboratorium,
 is named in his honor.

Publications 
 Toepassing der statistische mechanica van Gibbs op moleculair-theoretische vraagstukken, Phd Thesis 26 March 1908, in Dutch
 Problemen der kinetische theorie van de stof, 1915
 Strahlungsgesetz und Intensität von Mehrfachlinien, 1924
 Intensität der Komponenten im Zeemaneffekt, 1924
 On the theory of the Brownian motion, 1930
 De beteekenis der natuurkunde voor cultuur en maatschappij, 1932

See also 
Uithof
Virial coefficient

References

External links
Snelders H.A.M. (2007-02-01). "Ornstein, Leonard Salomon (1880-1941)", in: Biografisch Woordenboek van Nederland. Retrieved on 2007-03-30.  (in Dutch).

The Ornstein-Zernike equation in the canonical ensemble

1880 births
1941 deaths
20th-century Dutch physicists
Probability theorists
Leiden University alumni
Academic staff of Utrecht University
Jewish scientists
Members of the Royal Netherlands Academy of Arts and Sciences
People from Nijmegen
Statistical physicists